Robert Ernest Hume (March 20, 1877 - January 4, 1948) was an Indian-born American author and professor of the History of Religions at Union Theological Seminary, Christian missionary in India, and congregational minister. His translation of The Thirteen Principle Upanishads is seen as the standard for the work.

Life 
Robert E. Hume was born on March 20, 1877 in Ahmednagar, India to Christian missionary parents, Robert Allen Hume and Abbie Burgess. He received his early education in India through his parents' missionary schools and later attended Newton High School in Massachusetts. Hume received his BA, MA, and PhD at Yale, after which he attended Union Theological for seminary school.

Works 

 Hinduism and War (1916) The American Journal of Theology, vol. 20, 31-44
 The Thirteen Principal Upanishads, with an Outline of the Philosophy of the Upanishads (1921) New York: Oxford University Press
 The World’s Living Religions (1924) New York: Scribner
 Treasure-house of the Living Religions (1932) New York: Scribner

References 

Union Theological Seminary (New York City) faculty
American Congregationalist missionaries
1877 births
1948 deaths
Congregationalist missionaries in India
American expatriates in India